In financial markets T+2 is a shorthand for trade date plus two days indicating when securities transactions must be settled. The rules or customs in financial markets are for securities transactions to be settled within a commonly understood 'settlement period'. The most common current settlement period for securities transactions is two business days after the day of a transaction - which is widely abbreviated to T+2.  On settlement, the seller must produce the security's certificate and executed share transfer form in exchange for payment from the purchaser. Many countries now dispense with the requirement that a physical stock certificate be produced, and have adopted electronic settlement systems.

Similarly, T+3 is the previous convention of trade date plus three days.

History

During the 1700s the Amsterdam Stock Exchange had close links with the London Stock Exchange and they would often list each other's stocks. To clear the trades, time was required for the physical stock certificate or cash to move from Amsterdam to London and back.  This led to a standard settlement period of 14 days which was the time it usually took for a courier to make the journey on horseback and by ship.  Most exchanges continued to use the same model over the next few hundred years.

Settlement procedures varied considerably across national stock markets. There were two main types of settlement period used by different countries, either a fixed number of days after the transaction known as fixed settlement lag or periodically on a fixed date when all transactions up to that date are settled known as fixed settlement date. In France, Italy, and, to some extent, Switzerland and Belgium, as well as some developing countries, the settlement of all transactions took place once a month on a fixed date. This
system was instituted by Napoleon. The last day of trading on which all trades are settled was called the liquidation.  The liquidation took place on the seventh business day preceding the end of the calendar month.

In the United States, the New York Stock Exchange used T+1 in the 1920s, and the American Stock Exchange used T+2 prior to 1953. These settlement periods were gradually extended to T+5 by the late 1960s.

Prompted in part by the Black Monday (1987) stock market crash, there has since been a move to reduce settlement times, and settlement dates in most exchanges reduced to three days (T+3). In 2017, the move by most stock exchanges was towards adoption of T+2 (trade date plus two days). For example, the United Kingdom adopted T+2 in October 2014 and the United States adopted T+2 in September 2017.

Indian stock exchanges plan to move to T+1 starting in 2022. The US and Canada are targeting a transition to T+1 in the first half of 2024.

Operation
The first day of a two-day settlement period (T+2) starts on the business day following the day that a security was purchased or sold. For example, if a stock is purchased on Friday at any time before the close of trade on that day, Saturday, Sunday and public holidays are not considered business days, so the two-day clock starts running on the next business day. A payment or check must arrive at the broker's office by the close of business on Tuesday, unless a public holiday delays the settlement day.

The rationale for the delayed settlement is to give time for the seller to get documents to the settlement and for the purchaser to clear the funds required for settlement. T+2 is the standard settlement period for normal trades on a stock exchange, and any other conditions need to be handled on an "off-market" basis.

Application
The two-day settlement period applies to most security transactions, including stocks, bonds, municipal securities, mutual funds traded through a brokerage firm, and limited partnerships that trade on an exchange.  Two-day settlement has also been the convention in the off-exchange foreign exchange market well before exchanges moved to this convention.

Government securities, stock options, and options on futures contracts settle on the next business day following the trade or T+1. Futures contracts themselves settle the day of the trade.

References

External links
 EU to reduce settlement time for securities, HSBC (2013)

Securities (finance)
Share trading
Settlement (finance)